Princess Maria Francesca of Savoy (Maria Francesca Anna Romana; 26 December 1914 – 7 December 2001) was the youngest daughter of Victor Emmanuel III of Italy and Elena of Montenegro. In 1939, she married Prince Luigi of Bourbon-Parma. She was a sister of Umberto II of Italy  and of Queen Giovanna of Bulgaria.

Biography 

Maria Francesca was born in Rome as the fifth and youngest child of her parents. She had three elder sisters, Yolanda, Giovanna, Mafalda, and a brother, Umberto. 

On 23 January 1939, in the Pauline Chapel of the Quirinal Palace in Rome, Maria Francesca married Prince Luigi of Bourbon-Parma (1899–1967), a younger son of Robert I, Duke of Parma, and Infanta Maria Antonia of Portugal. Her husband was a brother of Zita, Empress of Austria, the last Empress of Austria and Queen of Hungary.

The couple moved to Cannes, where all four of their children were born. Maria was interned with her husband and two elder children by the Nazis during World War II. In 1945 the Anglo-Americans freed them and they returned to Italy. After the war, they lived in Italy for a while, then returned to France. She took up permanent residence in Mandelieu, near Cannes, after her husband's death in 1967.

They had four children: 
Prince Guy of Bourbon-Parma (7 August 1940, Cannes – 10 March 1991, Paris); married Brigitte Peu-Duvallon on 11 November 1964, divorced 17 September 1981, with issue.
 Prince Rémy of Bourbon-Parma (born 14 July 1942, Cannes); married firstly Laurence Dufresne d'Arganchy 10 February 1973, divorced 1983, with issue. He wed secondly Elisabeth Tardif on 5 July 2003. 
 Princess Chantal of Bourbon-Parma (born 24 November 1946, Cannes); married firstly Panayotis Skinas on 1 July 1977, divorced 1987, with issue. She wed secondly Francois-Henri Georges on 24 September 1988.
 Prince Jean of Bourbon-Parma (born 15 October 1961, Cannes); married Virginia Roatta on 26 March 1988, with issue. Jean is the youngest grandchild of Robert I, Duke of Parma.

Honours
  House of Savoy: Dame Grand Cross of the Order of Saints Maurice and Lazarus
 :  Dame Grand Cross of Honour and Devotion of the Sovereign Military Order of Malta, 3rd First Class
  Austrian Imperial and Royal Family: Dame of the Order of the Starry Cross, 2nd Class

Ancestry

References

External links

 

1914 births
2001 deaths
Deaths in France
Princesses of Savoy
Knights Grand Cross of the Order of Saints Maurice and Lazarus
Knights of Malta
Italian Roman Catholics
20th-century Roman Catholics
21st-century Roman Catholics
Nobility from Rome
Italian people of Montenegrin descent
Italian exiles
Daughters of emperors
Daughters of kings